Pureza station is an elevated Manila Light Rail Transit (LRT) station situated on Line 2. The station is located in Santa Mesa, Manila and is named because of its location on Pureza Street.

The station is the third station for trains headed to Antipolo and the eleventh station for trains headed to Recto.

Accessibility
Pureza station is fully wheelchair accessible in the south entrance. However, the north entrance doesn't have an elevator to the concourse area.

Nearby landmarks
The station's north entrance is interconnected with The Station Point commercial building, where the AMA Computer College Manila Campus is located. Landmarks nearby the station include other educational institutions such as De Ocampo Memorial College, Pio del Pilar Elementary School, Polytechnic University of the Philippines, Sacred Heart of Jesus Parish and Catholic School, Nuestra Señora de Salvacion Parish, and Eulogio "Amang" Rodriguez Institute of Science and Technology (EARIST). Commercial establishments in the vicinity include Puregold Jr. Pureza, Savemore Market, variety retail shops, and flea markets.

Some students studying in the University of Santo Tomas opt to depart from this station. A tricycle is available for transport to a jeepney terminal bound for Tayuman. The other station used by UST students in going to the university is the Legarda station. A bus terminal of AB Liner Inc., where buses bound for Tagkawayan, Quezon could be found, is located near the station.

A Philippine National Railways station, Santa Mesa, is a short walk from Pureza station. The PUP ferry station for the Pasig River Ferry Service is further south from Santa Mesa station.

See also
Manila Light Rail Transit System Line 2

References

Manila Light Rail Transit System stations
Railway stations opened in 2004
Buildings and structures in Santa Mesa